Burkovsky is a rural locality (a khutor) in Frunzenskoye Rural Settlement, Sredneakhtubinsky District, Volgograd Oblast, Russia. The population was 866 as of 2010. There are 32 streets.

Geography 
Burkovsky is located 16 km west of Srednyaya Akhtuba (the district's administrative centre) by road. Gospitomnik is the nearest rural locality.

References 

Rural localities in Sredneakhtubinsky District